Molly Helen Shannon (born September 16, 1964) is an American actress and comedian. Shannon was a cast member on the NBC sketch comedy series Saturday Night Live from 1995 to 2001. In 2017, she won the Film Independent Spirit Award for Best Supporting Actress for her role in the film Other People.

She has appeared in supporting roles in a number of films, such as Happiness (1998), A Night at the Roxbury (1998), Never Been Kissed (1999), How the Grinch Stole Christmas (2000), Wet Hot American Summer (2001), reprising her character in the miniseries Wet Hot American Summer: First Day of Camp (2015), and its follow-up Wet Hot American Summer: Ten Years Later (2017), Osmosis Jones (2001), My Boss's Daughter (2003), Talladega Nights: The Ballad of Ricky Bobby (2006), and Me and Earl and the Dying Girl (2015). Her voice can also be heard in the animated films Igor (2008) and the Hotel Transylvania film series (2012–2022). In television, Shannon is known for her roles in Enlightened (2013), Divorce (2016–2019), The White Lotus (2021) and I Love That for You (2022).

Early life 
Shannon was born in Cleveland, Ohio, on September 16, 1964, to an Irish-American Catholic family, and grew up in Shaker Heights, Ohio. Her mother, Mary Margaret "Peg" (née Keating), was a teacher, and her father, James Francis Shannon, was a sales manager. Her maternal grandparents were born in Ireland, with her grandfather being from Cloghmore, Achill, Mayo. When Shannon was four years old, her mother, younger sister, and cousin died in a car crash while her father was driving under the influence.

Shannon attended St. Dominic School in Shaker Heights for grade school, and Hawken School in Gates Mills, Ohio. She attended New York University, where she studied drama and graduated from NYU's Tisch School of the Arts in 1987.

Career 
Before Saturday Night Live, Shannon worked as a hostess at Cravings restaurant on Sunset Boulevard and as a food demo girl at Gelson's super market in Marina Del Rey. She auditioned for her first big film role and was cast, playing the supporting part of Meg in the 1989 horror film remake of The Phantom of the Opera, with Robert Englund. In 1991, she had a brief appearance in the second season of Twin Peaks as "the happy helping hand lady", and in 1993, she appeared with minor roles in three episodes of In Living Color, the first in a fake TV commercial with Shawn Wayans playing Chris Rock, the second in a sketch with Jim Carrey, playing LAPD Sergeant Stacey Koon, and third being a parody of Star Trek.

Shannon's major break came in February 1995, when she was hired as a featured player on Saturday Night Live to replace Janeane Garofalo after Garofalo left mid-season due to creative differences. Shannon was one of the few cast members to be kept (along with David Spade, Norm Macdonald, Mark McKinney and Tim Meadows) when Lorne Michaels overhauled his cast and writers for season 21 (1995–96).

She appeared in a 1997 episode of Seinfeld titled "The Summer of George," where she played Sam, the co-worker who drove Elaine Benes crazy because she did not swing her arms while walking. She also appeared in Sheryl Crow's video for the song "A Change (Will Do You Good)" and played the recurring role of loony neighbor Val Bassett, Grace Adler's nemesis, on Will & Grace, appearing in five episodes over the sitcom's eight-season run. In 1998, she played the role of Emily Sanderson in the film A Night at the Roxbury, featuring Will Ferrell and Chris Kattan who were also cast members of SNL at the time.
She also appeared in Sex and the City in a number of episodes.

In 1999, Shannon starred in Superstar, a feature film based on her most famous SNL character, Mary Katherine Gallagher, the awkward Catholic school student who aspires to be a musical superstar.

During her run on SNL, Shannon also starred in the movie Never Been Kissed (1999), How The Grinch Stole Christmas (2000), Osmosis Jones (2001) and Serendipity opposite Kate Beckinsale (2001). Shannon left SNL in 2001. In 2003, she appeared in the romantic comedy My Boss's Daughter and the television remake of The Music Man.

In 2004, she starred in a short-lived Fox network television series Cracking Up with actor Jason Schwartzman created by Mike White. That same year, she guest starred in an episode of Scrubs and starred as Mrs. Baker in the film Good Boy!.  In 2006, Shannon was featured in the Sofia Coppola-directed movie Marie Antoinette as Aunt Victoire. The next year, Shannon guest-starred on ABC's Pushing Daisies, and appeared in the film Evan Almighty.  Shannon also made a rare move to drama, appearing in Mike White's film Year of the Dog in 2007. In 2013, Shannon joined White again, playing his love interest Eileen in the HBO show Enlightened, for which she was nominated for an Emmy for outstanding guest actress.

Shannon hosted Saturday Night Live on May 12, 2007, making her the second former female cast member to host (after Julia Louis-Dreyfus) and the first one to have been a cast member for Lorne Michaels (Louis-Dreyfus was a cast member under Dick Ebersol).

In 2008, Shannon starred as Kath in the American version of the hit Australian sitcom Kath & Kim.

In early 2010, Shannon was cast in a recurring role on the Fox television series Glee as Brenda Castle, an astronomy and badminton teacher who has a rivalry with main character Sue Sylvester.

She returned to Saturday Night Live for a special Mother's Day episode on May 8, 2010, and also the October 2010 reunion special "Women of SNL".

Shannon replaced Katie Finneran in the role of Marge McDougall in the Broadway revival of Promises, Promises on October 12, 2010, and remained through its closure on January 2, 2011, along with co-stars Sean Hayes and Kristin Chenoweth.

Shannon's first children's book, Tilly the Trickster, was released September 1, 2011.

As of spring 2012, she has replaced Pauley Perrette as the spokesperson for Expedia.

In 2015, Shannon starred in the Sundance premiere of Me and Earl and the Dying Girl directed by Alfonso Gomez-Rejon. She was a guest, along with Denis Leary, on The Tonight Show Starring Jimmy Fallon on June 9, 2015.

In 2016, Shannon co-starred in the HBO comedy Divorce opposite Sarah Jessica Parker and Thomas Haden Church.

Shannon won the 2017 Film Independent Spirit Award for Best Supporting Actress for her performance in the highly acclaimed drama, Other People.  She had two films premiere at the 2017 Sundance Film Festival: The Little Hours and Fun Mom Dinner.

In 2018, Shannon co-hosted the Rose Parade with Will Ferrell on Amazon Prime Video in character as fictional local television personalities, Tish and Cord. In 2018, Shannon and Ferrell co-hosted HBO's broadcast of the wedding of Prince Harry and Meghan Markle as their characters Tish and Cord.

In 2018, Shannon co-starred in the critically acclaimed Netflix film Private Life, playing prickly Cynthia, opposite Kathryn Hahn, Paul Giamatti and Kayli Carter.

In 2022, Shannon released Hello, Molly!: A Memoir that discussed how family tragedy affected her career.

In 2022, Shannon co-starred in the Showtime comedy television series I Love That for You alongside fellow former Saturday Night Live alum Vanessa Bayer.

Personal life 
Shannon married artist Fritz Chesnut on May 29, 2004. They have a daughter and a son.

Filmography

Film

Television

Web series

Music videos

Saturday Night Live characters

Original characters 
 Mary Katherine Gallagher, Shannon's best known character. An odd, outcast student at a Catholic school who enjoyed performing in the choir and school plays. Shannon starred in a 1999 feature film based on the character.
 Sally O'Malley, a proud 50-year-old dancer ("I’m FIFTY!") with a bouffant hairdo, who wore tight red pants and proclaimed how much she loved to "kick, stretch and kick!"
 Circe Nightshade, co-host of "Goth Talk" (with Chris Kattan).
 Miss Colleen, co-host of "Dog Show" (with Will Ferrell).
 Elizabeth, one of the "Southern Gals."
 Helen Madden, an overly exuberant self-proclaimed "Joyologist", who appeared on talk shows with the trademark catchphrase "I love it, I love it, I love it!"
 Veronica Kilvere, an airhead fashion model who hosts the "Veronica & Co." talk show.
 Janette Blow, wife of Joe Blow (played by Colin Quinn) on "The Local News" public-access television cable TV talk show.
 Terri Rialto, co-host of the NPR radio show "Delicious Dish" (with Ana Gasteyer).
 Margaret Healy, a woman who enjoys doing many voices and accents.
 Jeannie Darcy, an unfunny mullet-haired stand-up comedian, who ended almost every joke with the phrase "Don't get me started, don't even get me started!"

Awards and nominations 

 Independent Spirit Award for Best Supporting FemaleNominated—AARP Movies for Grownups Award for Best Supporting ActressNominated—Awards Circuit Community Award for Best Supporting ActressNominated—Washington D.C. Area Film Critics Association Award for Best Supporting Actress
 Nominated—Critics' Choice Television Award for Best Guest Performer in a Comedy SeriesNominated—Primetime Emmy Award for Outstanding Guest Actress in a Comedy Series
 Nominated—Primetime Emmy Award for Outstanding Guest Actress in a Comedy Series (2018)

References

External links 

 
 
 The Career Cookbook Molly Shannon Profile
 Maxim Rated Top SNL performer
 ontheinside.info/Molly Shannon

1964 births
Living people
20th-century American actresses
21st-century American actresses
21st-century American comedians
Actors from Shaker Heights, Ohio
Actresses from Cleveland
American film actresses
American people of Irish descent
American sketch comedians
American television actresses
American voice actresses
Circle in the Square Theatre School alumni
Hawken School alumni
Independent Spirit Award for Best Supporting Female winners
Tisch School of the Arts alumni